Abhiyum Naanum was a 2020-2023 Indian-Tamil soap opera television series airing on Sun TV. It premiered on 26 October 2020 and ended on 25 February 2023 with 726 Episodes. It stars Riya Manoj, Vidhya Mohan and Nidhish Kutty. The show is available on Sun NXT.

Synopsis
The story revolves around Abhirami, who is also known as Abhi, an eight-year-old girl who is raised by Saravanan, who works as a driver for a wealthy family. She develops a special bond with Meena, Saravanan's employer. Eventually, it is revealed that Abhi is in fact the long-lost child of Meena and her husband Shiva who was adopted at a young age by Saravanan, due to an astrological prediction that if the first child born to Meena and Shiva was raised by them, they will not survive when the child is 9 years old. Abhi also faces conflicts with Mukhil, Meena and Shiva's pampered son who is jealous of the attention Abi receives from his mother. Along with this Girija, Shiva's younger sister, is a miser and greedy person who hates Abhi and Meena, and Rajeshwari, the family matriarch.

Cast

Main  
 Riya Manoj as Abhirami "Abhi" Sivasubramaniam: Siva and Meena's daughter; Saravanan's adoptive daughter; Mukhil's sister(2020-2023).
 Vidhya Mohan as Meena Veluchamy Sivasubramaniam: Veluchamy and Vijayalakshmi's daughter; Eshwaran's sister; Siva wife; Abhi and Mukhil's mother(2020-2023). 
 Nidhish Kutty as Ilamukhil "Mukhil" Sivasubramaniam: Siva and Meena's son; Abhi's brother(2020-2023).

Supporting
 Shyam as Raghuvaran "Raghu" Sangilikaruppan: Rajeswari and Sangilikaruppan's younger son; Siva and Girija's brother; Janani's ex-fiancé; Vaathi's husband.
 Ramya Gowda as Vaathi Vishwanathan Raghuvaran – Jaanaki and Vishwanathan's youngest daughter; Kaarkulali and Magilni's sister; Raghu's wife.
 Akhila Prakash as Girija Sangilikaruppan Sundaramoorthy − Rajeshwari and Sangilikaruppan's daughter; Siva and Raghu's sister; Sundar's wife; Sumo's mother.(Main Antagonist)
 Kurinji Nathan as Sundaramoorthy aka Sundar − Girija's husband; Sumo's father.(Antagonist)
Aravind Akash as Dr. Sivasubramaniam "Siva" Sangilikaruppan: Rajeshwari and Sangilikaruppan's elder son; Girija and Raghu's brother; Meena's husband; Abhi and Mukhil's father.
Latha as Rajeshwari Sangilikaruppan: Vishwanathan's sister; Sangilikaruppan's widow; Siva, Girija and Raghu's mother; Abhi, Mukhil and Sumo's grandmother.
 Aadhish Jatti Jaganathan as Sumohan "Sumo" Sundarmoorthy – Girija and Sumo's son; Abhi and Mukhil's cousin. 
 Rajkamal as Saravanan – Abhi's adoptive father; Keerthi's love interest.
 Yamuna Chinnadurai as Keerthi – Mukhil's teacher; Saravanan's love interest.
 Lakshmi Raj / Sekar Raja as Eshwaran Veluchamy − Veluchamy and Vijayalakshmi's son; Meena's brother; Kalyani's husband.
 Vanaja as Kalyani Eshwaran − Eshwaran's wife. 
 Vasu Vikram as Veluchamy − Vijayalakshmi's husband; Eshwaran and Meena's father; Abhi and Mukhil's grandfather.
 Dharani as Vijayalakshmi Veluchamy − Veluchamy's wife; Eshwaran and Meena's mother; Abhi and Mukhil's grandmother.
 Sathish Arunagiri as Dr. Prakash – Siva's arch-rival.(Main Antagonist)
 Master Jerome as Munna – Mukhil's friend.
 Roja Sholapur as Jaanaki Vishwanathan – Sethupet Sekizhar's daughter; Vishwanathan's widow; Kaarkulali, Maagilni and Vaathi's mother.
 Hensha Deepan as Maagilni Vishwanathan – Jaanaki's second daughter; Kaarkulali and Vaathi's sister.
 Nisha as Kaarkulali Vishwanathan – Jaanaki's eldest daughter; Maagilni and Vaathi's sister.
 V C Jeyamani as Sethupet Sekizlar – Retired Tamil Professor; Jaanaki's father; Kaarkulali, Magilni and Vaathi's grandfather; Mukhil's tuition master.
 Tamil Selvan as Kuruvi – Vaathi's friend.

Special appearances
 Jaishankar as Sangilikaruppan − Rajeshwari's husband; Siva, Girija and Raghu's father; Abhi, Mukhil and Sumo's grandfather. (Dead)
 Parthan Siva as Vishwanathan – Rajeshwari's brother; Jaanaki's husband; Kaarkulali, Maagilni and Vaathi's father. (Dead)
 Singampuli as Pulikutty – Rajeshwari's cousin's son
 Jangiri Madhumitha as Jill Jung Juck – Pulikutty wife
 Rj Vigneshkanth as Harrish - Siva's friend (Dead)
Nandita Swetha as herself - Raghu's love interest
Suhasini as Meenakshi - Nandhitha's sister
Baba Lakshman as Meenakshi's husband
Narasimha Raju as Himalayan priest
Jishnu Menon as Karthikeyan

Dubbed versions

Reception
In its debut week, it became the fifth most watched Tamil television program garnering 6.6 million impressions. The following week it increased to 6.89 million impressions occupying the same position as of previous week. The following week it garnered 7.10 million impressions. In week 47, it dropped to 6.853 million impressions occupying fifth position.

Soundtrack

Broadcast network
The series was released on 26 October 2020 on Sun TV and also airs on Sun TV HD. The program was also broadcast internationally on Sun TV. The program's episodes are released on the YouTube channel Sun TV and the app Sun NXT after the original broadcast.

References

External links 
Official Website 

Sun TV original programming
Tamil-language children's television series
2020s Tamil-language television series
2020 Tamil-language television series debuts
Tamil-language television shows
Television shows set in Tamil Nadu
2023 Tamil-language television series endings